Ali Mirsepassi (born 1950) is an Iranian-American sociologist and political scientist and Albert Gallatin Research Excellence Professor of Middle Eastern and Islamic studies at New York University.

Books
 The Discovery of Iran: Taghi Arani, a Radical Cosmopolitan, Cambridge University Press, 2021
 Iran's Quiet Revolution: The Downfall of the Pahlavi State, Cambridge University Press, 2019
 Iran’s Troubled Modernity: Debating Ahmad Fardid’s Legacy, Cambridge University Press, 2018
 Transnationalism in Iranian Political Thought: The Life and Thought of Ahmad Fardid, Cambridge University Press, 2017
 Islam, Democracy, and Cosmopolitanism, Cambridge University Press, 2014, co-author, with Tadd Fernee
 Political Islam, Iran and Enlightenment, Cambridge University Press, 2011
 Democracy in Modern Iran, New York University Press, 2010
 Intellectual Discourses and Politics of Modernization: Negotiating Modernity in Iran, Cambridge University Press, 2000
 Truth or Democracy 
 Localizing Knowledge in a Globalizing World, Syracuse University Press, 2002, coeditor
 Al Ghazali’s Alchemy of Happiness, forthcoming
 Iran’s Quiet Revolution: The Downfall of the Pahlavi State, forthcoming, Cambridge University Press

References

Living people
American political scientists
1950 births
American sociologists
Iranian sociologists
Iranian political scientists
New York University faculty
American University alumni
University of Tehran alumni